The Metropolitan Police Specialist Training Centre is a specialist training centre for the Metropolitan Police in Gravesend, Kent. It provides both Public Disorder and Specialist Firearms training to officers drawn from the MPS, British Transport Police and City of London Police.

The centre was purpose-built for the Metropolitan Police and opened in 2003.

The site
The site covers 9,250 square metres and was rebuilt by Equion.It was a former military firing range and also the National Civilian Seacraft training centre before the centre relocated to the local college campus.

It features mock roads, shops, a pub, a bank, a nightclub, a football stadium, train and underground stations with full-size carriages and a full-size section of an aircraft. There are also classrooms and lecture theatres, accommodation for more than 300 people, stables for 10 police horses and an abseil tower.

In media
The site was photographed by James Rawlings in 2014 when he was given access to the site. It took several months of negotiations with authorities for Rawlings to get permission to photograph the site and restrictions included not showing the faces of officers who took part in training.

The site has also appeared on Television in the former police procedural drama "The Bill".

References

Gravesham
Gravesend, Kent
Metropolitan Police training establishments
2003 establishments in the United Kingdom
Port of London
Buildings and structures in Kent